"The Eton Rifles" is a song written by Paul Weller. It was recorded by The Jam, and was the only song to be released as a single from that group's album Setting Sons. Released on 26 October 1979, it became the band's first top-ten hit on the UK Singles Chart, peaking at No. 3. This is the only official Jam single for which a video was not recorded.

The song was recorded at Townhouse Studios, and produced by Vic Coppersmith-Heaven and The Jam. The single's B-side is "See-Saw".

Background 
Eton College is a famous English public school located in Berkshire, and is regarded as the epitome of Britain's privileged elite. Their cadet corps is the Eton College Combined Cadet Force, founded in 1860 as the Eton College Rifle Corps.

The lyrics recount the difficulties faced by the unemployed and lower-paid working class in protesting against a system stacked against them.

David Cameron 
In May 2008, Conservative leader and Old Etonian David Cameron named "The Eton Rifles" as one of his favourite songs. Cameron is reported to have said, "I was one, in the corps. It meant a lot, some of those early Jam albums we used to listen to. I don't see why the left should be the only ones allowed to listen to protest songs." Cameron's praise for the song earned a scathing rejection from Paul Weller, who said, "Which part of it didn't he get? It wasn't intended as a fucking jolly drinking song for the cadet corps."

In November 2011, The Guardian music critic Alexis Petridis questioned Cameron further:You said the Jam's song Eton Rifles was important to you when you were at Eton. Paul Weller, who wrote the song, was pretty incredulous to hear this, and claimed you couldn't have understood the lyrics. What did you think that song was about at the time? Be honest.
Cameron replied:I went to Eton in 1979, which was the time when the Jam, the Clash, the Sex Pistols were producing some amazing music and everyone liked the song because of the title. But of course I understood what it was about. It was taking the mick out of people running around the cadet force. And he was poking a stick at us. But it was a great song with brilliant lyrics. I've always thought that if you can only like music if you agree with the political views of the person who wrote it, well, it'd be rather limiting.

In 1977, Weller had stated in the New Musical Express that people should vote for the Conservatives, a comment intended to shock and which later came back to haunt him during his long involvement with the Labour Party initiative Red Wedge. He added:I think I have pretty much nailed where I was at to the mast. But people come to gigs for different reasons: it isn't necessarily about what the person on stage is singing. But at the same time, you do think, "Well, maybe this'll change their minds."

Legacy
The song was ranked at number one among the top "Tracks of the Year" for 1979 by NME. In 2022, it was included in the list "The story of NME in 70 (mostly) seminal songs", at number 16.

References

1979 singles
1979 songs
Polydor Records singles
Song recordings produced by Vic Coppersmith-Heaven
Songs written by Paul Weller
The Jam songs